Krüppel-like factor 14, also known as basic transcription element-binding protein 5 (BTEB5) is a protein that in humans is encoded by the KLF14 gene. The corresponding Klf14 mouse gene is known as Sp6.

Function 
KLF14 is a member of the Krüppel-like factor family of transcription factors.  It regulates the transcription of various genes, including TGFβRII (the type II receptor for TGFβ). KLF14 is expressed in many tissues, lacks introns, and is subject to parent-specific expression.

KLF14 appears to be a master regulator of gene expression in adipose tissue.

Protein structure 

Like the other members of the KLF family, KLF14 has three zinc-finger domains near the C-terminus, all three of which are of the classical C2H2 type.  In the human, they are at amino acids 195–219, 225–249, and 255–277.

Human KLF14 is 323 amino acids in length, with a molecular weight of 33,124; in the mouse its length is 325.

Clinical significance 

There appears to be a connection between KLF14 and coronary artery disease, hypercholesterolemia and type 2 diabetes.

References

External links 
 Huffington Post: Scientists Find Genetic 'Switch' For Obesity

Transcription factors